The Al Tayer Tower, aka Manazel Al Safa Tower, is a 59-floor residential tower in Dubai, United Arab Emirates. Its location along Sheikh Zayed Road gives it close proximity to Downtown Dubai (the district that includes the Burj Khalifa and the Dubai Mall) and Business Bay. The design of the tower was completed in 2005, but ground works did not begin until Spring 2006.  The building began to rise above ground level in December 2006. The first glass was put on the building in April 2007, but this was only two windows. Not until September did major cladding begin. Tower will have a total of 244 apartments that come in various sizes.  Built behind the tower will be an 11-floor parking garage, also built by Al Shafar General Contracting Co. LLC.

References

See also 

 List of tallest buildings in Dubai
 List of tallest buildings in the United Arab Emirates

Residential buildings completed in 2008
Residential skyscrapers in Dubai